"Robbery" is a song by Australian pop rock duo Lime Cordiale, released on 20 September 2019 as the fifth single from their second studio album 14 Steps to a Better You (2020).

The song was polled at number 7 in the Triple J Hottest 100, 2019.

The music video was nominated for Best Video at the ARIA Music Awards of 2020.

The song was nominated for Most Performed Alternative Work at the APRA Music Awards of 2021.

Background
In an interview, Lime Cordiale member Louis Leimbach said: "I love the 60s feel to the song. The whole song could just be a baritone sax and a snare and all the main elements would be there. The song all started with that line 'Hey, there's been a robbery'. When you meet someone, even just for a moment, they make an impact and then they're gone. You're left feeling robbed. You feel as though you need to find them somehow but it's no use."

Release
"Robbery" was released for digital download and on streaming services on 20 September 2019.

Chart performance
"Robbery" debuted and peaked at number 63 on the ARIA Singles Chart for the chart dated 3 February 2020, a week after polling at number 7 in Triple J's Hottest 100 of 2019.

"Robbery" was certified gold in Australia in June 2020, before being certified platinum by the year's end.

Music video
The music video was directed and produced by Jack Shepherd, Oliver Leimbach, Louis Leimbach, James Jennings, Felix Bornholdt, Nich Polovineo and Adam Haynes.

Synopsis
The video follows a "broken-hearted" Louis to various landmarks and vistas across Spain, Ireland, France, England, Netherlands, Belgium and Australia as he searches for romance.

Critical reception
Debbie Carr of Triple J called the song a "cute lil ditty" saying the duo "have nailed the art of the impossibly catchy hooks".

Credits and personnel

Song credits
Adapted from the parent album's liner notes.

Musicians
Lime Cordiale
 Oliver Leimbach – vocals, guitar, bass, saxophone, trumpet, flute, clarinet, kazoo
 Louis Leimbach – vocals, guitar, bass, saxophone, trumpet, flute, clarinet, kazoo

Other musicians
 Shane Eli Abrahams – writing
 Jonathan Parkfar – writing
 Bijou Choder – writing
 James Jennings – drums
 Felix Bornholdt – keyboards
 Nicholas Polovineo – trombone, trumpet, flugelhorn
 Chris O'Dea – baritone saxophone

Technical
 Dave Hammer – production, mixing
 Brian Lucey at Magic Gardens Mastering – mastering

Artwork
Adapted from the band's official website.

 Louis Leimbach – cover design

Charts

Weekly charts

Year-end charts

Certifications

Notes

References

2019 singles
2019 songs
Lime Cordiale songs
Songs written by Louis Leimbach
Songs written by Oli Leimbach